Simon Morales (born 14 April 1964) is a Colombian boxer. He competed in the men's flyweight event at the 1988 Summer Olympics. At the 1988 Summer Olympics, he lost to Setsuo Segawa of Japan.

References

1964 births
Living people
Colombian male boxers
Olympic boxers of Colombia
Boxers at the 1988 Summer Olympics
Place of birth missing (living people)
Flyweight boxers